Aniket Vishwasrao is an Indian actor. He is best known for his work in Marathi cinema. He made his screen debut in Sudhir Mishra's Chameli and first appeared in Marathi cinema with Lapoon Chhapoon (2007). In 2011, he achieved popularity with the release of Fakt Ladh Mhana.

Personal life
Vishwasrao was educated at St. Francis High School, Borivali in Mumbai and continued his studies at M. L. Dahanukar College. For many years, he was in a relationship with Marathi actress Pallavi Subhash. In December 2014, Subhash confirmed their split.

Career
Vishwasrao has appeared in both TV serials and films, though he is best known for his role as Alex in Mahesh Manjarekar's Fakt Ladh Mhana, which was directed by cinematographer Sanjay Jadhav. Aniket has also done a role in film Story Hai Pan Khari Hai.

Filmography

Television

Theatre
 Love Bird
 Suryachi pille
 Nakalat Saare Ghadale
 A Perfect Murder

References

External links

Indian male film actors
Male actors from Mumbai
21st-century Indian male actors
Male actors in Marathi cinema
Male actors in Hindi cinema
1981 births
Living people
Indian male soap opera actors
Indian male comedians
Male actors in Marathi television